Saint Rieul, Bishop of Reims, was bishop of that town from 673 to around 689.  He was a supporter of Ebroin.  

Ebroin's supporters, which included Rieul, Praejectus, St. Agilbert of Paris, and St. Ouen of Rouen, held a council of bishops that sat in judgment on Leger, at Marly, near Paris.  Praejectus’ murderer may have been a supporter of Leger, who was later murdered on October 2, 679.

False oaths
After their defeat at the Battle of Lucofao in late 679 or early 680, Austrasian Dukes Martin and Pepin of Herstal fled the battlefield. Martin went to Laon. Bishop Rieul and one Agilbert lured him to Ecry on the pretext of negotiations with King Theuderic III, giving false assurances, by swearing upon reliquaries that Martin did not know were empty. Trusting them, Martin went to Ecry where he and his supporters were killed.

References 

7th-century Frankish bishops
Bishops of Reims
7th-century Frankish saints